Nanette June Leslie (June 4, 1926 – July 30, 2000) was an American actress. She was known for playing Martha McGivern in the American western television series The Californians.

Life and career 
Leslie was born in Los Angeles, California, the daughter of Alma and Frank Leslie, a salesman. Leslie attended University High School. She began her career in 1945 in the film Under Western Skies. Leslie starred, co-starred and appeared in other films such as Guns of Hate, The Devil Thumbs a Ride, Under the Tonto Rim, Sunset Pass, The Miracle of the Hills, Western Heritage, The Arizona Ranger, Wild Horse Mesa and I'll Remember April.

Between 1949 and 1955 Leslie appeared in eight episodes of The Lone Ranger; the most appearances in the series by any actress. She played Faith Harding in four episodes of The Gene Autry Show, 1950-1955. In 1954, Leslie guest-starred in the western television series Annie Oakley. She also guest-starred in The Adventures of Kit Carson and The Cisco Kid, appearing in five episodes of each. Leslie later joined the cast of the western television series The Californians, playing Jack McGivern's wife Martha McGivern from 1957 to 1958. Leslie retired in 1968, her last credit being for the film The Bamboo Saucer.

Death 
Leslie died in July 2000 from complications of pneumonia in San Juan Capistrano, California, at the age of 74. She was buried in Pacific View Memorial Park.

References

External links 

Rotten Tomatoes profile

1926 births
2000 deaths
People from Los Angeles
Actresses from Los Angeles
Deaths from pneumonia in California
American film actresses
American television actresses
20th-century American actresses
Western (genre) television actors
Western (genre) film actresses
Burials at Pacific View Memorial Park
University High School (Los Angeles) alumni